Ian Gabriel Holland (born 3 October 1990) is an American cricketer who plays for the United States cricket team and for Hampshire County Cricket Club in England. He has also played domestic cricket in Australia.

Career
Holland made his first-class debut for Victoria on 3 February 2016 in the 2015–16 Sheffield Shield. Holland earned his first contract with Victoria by winning Cricket Superstar, a reality TV series.

He made his List A debut for the English side Hampshire in the 2017 Royal London One-Day Cup on 27 April 2017. He made his Twenty20 cricket debut, also for Hampshire, in the 2017 NatWest t20 Blast on 3 August 2017.

Holland holds a United States passport. In June 2019, he was named in a 30-man training squad for the United States cricket team, ahead of the Regional Finals of the 2018–19 ICC T20 World Cup Americas Qualifier tournament in Bermuda. The following month, he was one of twelve players to sign a three-month central contract with USA Cricket. In November 2019, he was named in the United States' squad for the 2019–20 Regional Super50 tournament. On 11 November 2019, he made his debut for the United States, against Guyana.

In December 2019, he was named in the United States' One Day International (ODI) squad for the 2019 United Arab Emirates Tri-Nation Series. He made his ODI debut for the United States, against the United Arab Emirates on 8 December 2019.

In August 2020, in the third round of matches in the 2020 Bob Willis Trophy, Holland took his maiden five-wicket haul in first-class cricket.

In October 2021, he was named in the American Twenty20 International (T20I) squad for the 2021 ICC Men's T20 World Cup Americas Qualifier tournament in Antigua. He made his T20I debut on 7 November 2021, for the United States against Belize.

References

External links
 

1990 births
Living people
American cricketers
Australian cricketers
Hampshire cricketers
Northamptonshire cricketers
People from Stevens Point, Wisconsin
Sportspeople from Wisconsin
Victoria cricketers
United States One Day International cricketers
United States Twenty20 International cricketers
American emigrants to the United Kingdom
English cricketers